Point of View is the thirteenth album by the American jazz group Spyro Gyra, released in June 1989 by GRP Records. At Billboard magazine, the album peaked at No. 120 on the Top 200 Albums chart.

Track listing 
 "Slow Burn" (Dave Samuels) – 4:07
 "Swing Street" (Jay Beckenstein) – 5:13 
 "Fairweather" (Tom Schuman) – 4:46
 "The Unknown Soldier" (Beckenstein) – 5:16
 "Hannibal's Boogie" (Beckenstein) – 5:59
 "No Limits" (Beckenstein) – 4:41* 
 "Carolina" (Richie Morales) – 4:34
 "Riverwalk" (Samuels) – 4:29
 "Swamp Thing" (Jeremy Wall) – 6:26
 "Counterpoint" (Wall) – 3:56
 "Gotcha" (Oskar Cartaya) – 4:09

"No Limits" (track No. 6) was not on the original LP but was included on the cassette and CD.

Personnel 
 Jay Beckenstein – saxophones
 Tom Schuman – keyboards
 Dave Samuels – mallet synthesizer, vibraphone, marimba
 Jay Azzolina – guitar
 Julio Fernández – rhythm guitar (5)
 Oskar Cartaya – bass
 Richie Morales – drums
 Roger Squitero – percussion (1, 7, 11)

Production 
 Jay Beckenstein – producer 
 Jeremy Wall – assistant producer
 Larry Swist – engineer, mixing 
 Chris Bubacz – additional engineer
 Doug Rose – assistant engineer
 Bob Ludwig – mastering at Masterdisk (New York City, New York).
 Stephen Walters – digital design 
 Jeff Katz – photography 
 Phil Brennan – management

References

External links
 Spyro Gyra-Point of View at AllMusic
 Spyro Gyra official web site

1989 albums
Spyro Gyra albums
GRP Records albums